Schlafen family member 5 is a protein that in humans is encoded by the SLFN5 gene.

References

Further reading